"If I Ruled the World (Imagine That)" is a song by American rapper Nas featuring fellow American singer Lauryn Hill, released on June 4, 1996 as the first single from his second album, It Was Written (1996). Produced by Trackmasters, with some uncredited input by Rashad Smith, it is based on the 1985 hit of the same name by American rapper Kurtis Blow and samples the beat of "Friends" by Whodini. Lauryn Hill's verse interpolates the song "Walk Right Up To The Sun" by The Delfonics. The single marked Hill's first musical appearance outside of the Fugees.

"If I Ruled the World", bolstered by a high-budget music video directed by Hype Williams and designed by visual artist and designer Ron Norsworthy, became Nas's first single to gain mainstream notice. The single reached number 53 on the Billboard Hot 100 chart, while also peaking in the top 20 on the Hot R&B/Hip-Hop Singles & Tracks chart, and on the Hot Rap Tracks chart. The song was nominated for a 1997 Grammy Award for Best Rap Solo Performance.  It is considered to be one of the greatest rap songs of all time by many publications. In June 2021, the song was certified Platinum by the Recording Industry Association of America, becoming Nas' first single to achieve this.

Critical reception
In an retrospective review, Daryl McIntosh of Albumism noted "If I Ruled the World (Imagine That)" as "an example of the album's ambition", complimenting it for having "one of the most memorable choruses of the era." Daisy & Havoc from Music Weeks RM Dance Update rated it five out of five, commenting, "This one should do well right now for a handful of reasons — it features Lauryn Hill from Fugees, it's not dissimilar to Fugees and, most importantly of all, it's a really appealing track with an addictive chorus, some great vocals and a laid-back but still serious rap. Just hope it doesn't get forgotten in the rush." David Fricke from Rolling Stone wrote that "New Yorker Nas beat hip-hop's sophomore jinx with the jaunty step and dead-sexy female chorus of "If I Ruled the World", this summer's cruisin' smash." He added, "To suggest that the world would be a better place if cocaine came uncut [...] hardly qualifies as social enlightenment."

Music video
The accompanying music video for "If I Ruled the World (Imagine That)" was directed by American director Hype Williams and designed by visual artist and designer Ron Norsworthy. It was released for the week ending on June 16, 1996.

Single track listing
 US 12" vinylA1. "If I Ruled the World" (Main Mix) (4:42) 
A2. "If I Ruled the World" (Instrumental) (4:34)
B1. "If I Ruled the World" (Clean Mix) (4:42) 
B2. "If I Ruled the World" (A Cappella) (4:42)

 Europe maxi-CD (COL 663296 2) "If I Ruled the World (Imagine That) (Main Mix)" (4:45)
 "If I Ruled the World (Imagine That) (Instrumental)" (4:36)
 "If I Ruled the World (Imagine That) (Clean Mix)" (4:45)
 "If I Ruled the World (Imagine That) (A Cappella)" (4:42)

 Europe CD (COL 663296 1)'
 "If I Ruled the World (Imagine That) (Main Mix)"
 "If I Ruled the World (Imagine That) (Instrumental)"

Charts

Weekly charts

Year-end charts

Certifications

References 

1996 singles
Music videos directed by Hype Williams
Nas songs
Lauryn Hill songs
Songs written by Nas
Songs written by Samuel Barnes (songwriter)
Songs written by Jean-Claude Olivier
1996 songs
Columbia Records singles
Song recordings produced by Trackmasters